Giuseppe Volpi may refer to:

 Giuseppe Volpi (1877–1947), Italian politician 
 Giuseppe Volpi (sailor) (1908–), Italian sailor